N,N-Dimethylsphingosine (also known as DMS) is an inhibitor of sphingosine kinase.

In rats with neuropathic pain, the natural metabolite DMS is unregulated in the dorsal horn.  Furthermore, DMS induces mechanical hypersensitivity when injected into rats.

References

Diols
Lipids